Marta Santos Ferreira is a Brazilian paracanoeist who has competed since the late 2000s. She won two medals at the 2010 ICF Canoe Sprint World Championships in Poznań with a gold in the K-1 200m TA and a silver in the K-1 200m LTA events.

References
 2010 ICF Canoe Sprint World Championships women's K-1 200 m LTA results. - accessed 20 August 2010.
 2010 ICF Canoe Sprint World Championships women's K-1 200 m TA results. - accessed 20 August 2010.

Year of birth missing (living people)
Living people
Brazilian female canoeists
Paracanoeists of Brazil
TA classification paracanoeists
ICF Canoe Sprint World Championships medalists in paracanoe
21st-century Brazilian women